The 1981–82 DePaul Blue Demons men's basketball team represented DePaul University during the 1981–82 NCAA Division I men's basketball season. They were led by head coach Ray Meyer, in his 40th season, and played their home games at the Rosemont Horizon in Rosemont.

Roster

Schedule

|-
!colspan=12 style=| NCAA Tournament

Source:

References 

1981 in sports in Illinois
DePaul Blue Demons men's basketball seasons
DePaul
1982 in sports in Illinois
DePaul